James McDonald may refer to:

Politics
 James McDonald (Irish politician), nationalist politician in Northern Ireland
 James McDonald (Canadian politician) (1828–1912), Canadian lawyer, politician, and judge
 James McDonald (New Zealand politician) (1837–1900), New Zealand politician
 James McDonald (Victorian Nationalist politician) (1856–1933), Victorian state MP
 James McDonald (Victorian Labor politician) (1889–1938), Victorian state MP
 James S. McDonald (1839–?), Nova Scotia politician
 James Greer McDonald (1824–1909), surveyor and member of the Los Angeles Common Council
 James E. McDonald (politician) (1881–1952), Texas Agriculture Commissioner
 James Grover McDonald (1886–1964), US ambassador
 James McDonald (Tasmanian politician) (1877–1947), Australian Labor Party Member of the Tasmania House of Assembly
 James Albert McDonald (1870–1957), Canadian politician in the Legislative Assembly of British Columbia

Sports
 James McDonald (baseball) (born 1984), American baseball pitcher
 James McDonald (Australian footballer) (born 1976), Australian rules footballer
 James McDonald (Scottish footballer), Scottish footballer
 James McDonald (American football) (born 1961), American football player
 James McDonald (jockey) (born 1992), New Zealand jockey
 James Allen McDonald (1915–1997), college and professional American football player
 James A. McDonald, American college football coach

Other
 James Charles McDonald (1840–1912), Roman Catholic bishop, fourth Bishop of Charlottetown, 1891–1912
 James McDonald (economist) (born c. 1942), economist at Brigham Young University
 James McDonald (RAF officer) (1899–?), World War I flying ace
 James McDonald (writer) (born 1953), British writer
 James McDonald (businessman) (1843–1915), English-American oil businessman
 James E. McDonald (1920–1971), American physicist, known for research regarding UFOs
 James Harper McDonald (1900–1973), American Navy diver and Medal of Honor recipient
 James McDonald (artist) (1865–1935), New Zealand artist and promoter of Maori arts and crafts
 James McDonald (lawyer) (died 1831), first Native American who professionally studied law
 F. James McDonald (1922–2010), American engineer and business executive

See also
 Jimmy McDonald (disambiguation) 
 Jim McDonald (disambiguation)
 James MacDonald (disambiguation)
 Jamie McDonald (disambiguation)